Time Machine Chefs is a television special that originally aired on ABC in which four celebrity chefs were challenged to cook against each other using ingredients and tools belonging to a historical era. The program was divided into two rounds; the first challenged the chefs to create a Peking duck in 16th century China during the Ming Dynasty and the second saw the chefs create a Cockentrice in 1532 in the House of Tudor.

References 

2010s American television specials
American Broadcasting Company original programming
2012 television specials